Lepcha may refer to:
Lepcha people, of eastern Nepal, Sikkim and Darjeeling district
Lepcha language, of the Lepcha people
Lepcha script 
Lepcha (Unicode block)
Lepcha (beetle), a genus of beetles in the family Carabidae
Ruben Lepcha (born 1988), Indian cricketer
Ruden Sada Lepcha (active from 2021), Indian politician from Gorkha Janmukti Morcha (Tamang)

See also
 

Language and nationality disambiguation pages